The top-end lowlands ctenotus (Ctenotus hilli)  is a species of skink found in the Northern Territory in  Australia.

References

hilli
Reptiles described in 1970
Taxa named by Glen Milton Storr